Saint Anthony Falls, or the Falls of Saint Anthony located at the northeastern edge of downtown Minneapolis, Minnesota, is the only natural major waterfall on the Mississippi River. Throughout the mid-to-late 1800’s, various dams were built atop the east and west faces of the falls to support the milling industry that spurred the growth of the city of Minneapolis. In 1880, the central face of the falls was reinforced with a sloping timber apron to stop the upstream erosion of the falls. In the 1950s, the apron was rebuilt with concrete, which makes up the most visible portion of the falls today. A series of locks were constructed in the 1950s and 1960s to extend navigation to points upstream.

The falls were renamed from their Dakota title in 1680 by Father Louis Hennepin after his patron saint, St. Anthony of Padua. The towns of St. Anthony and Minneapolis, which had developed on the east and west sides of the falls, respectively, merged in 1872 to fully use the power of the falls for milling operations. From 1880 to about 1930, Minneapolis was known as the "Flour Milling Capital of the World".

Today, the falls are defined by the spillway, the upper dam and the locks, located just downstream of the 3rd Avenue Bridge, and the Lower Lock and Dam, just upstream of the I-35W Saint Anthony Falls Bridge. These locks were built as part of the Upper Mississippi River 9-Foot Navigation Project. The area around the falls is designated the St. Anthony Falls Historic District and features a  self-guided walking trail with signs explaining the area's past.

History

The falls hold cultural and spiritual significance for native tribes who frequented and lived in the area. The falls is an important and sacred site to the Mdewakanton Dakota and they called the Mississippi River, hahawakpa, "river of the falls". The falls (Haha) themselves were given specific names, mnirara "curling waters", owahmenah "falling waters", or owamni, "whirlpool" (mniyomni in the Eastern Dakota dialect and owamniyomni in the Teton Dakota (Lakota) dialect). Dakota associate the falls with legends and spirits, including Oanktehi, god of waters and evil, who lived beneath the falling water. A small island in the stream, called Spirit Island, was once a nesting ground for eagles that fed on fish below the falls. Dakota people camped on Nicollet Island upstream of the falls to fish and to tap the sugar maple trees.

Since the cataract had to be portaged, the area became one of the natural resting and trade points along the Mississippi between Dakota and Anishinaabe peoples. The Anishinaabe (Ojibwe) term was recorded as "kakabikah" (gakaabikaa, "split rock" or more descriptively, gichi-gakaabikaa, "the great severed rock" which referenced the jagged chunks of limestone constantly eroding by the falls).

In 1680, the falls became known to the Western world when they were observed and published in a journal by Father Louis Hennepin, a Catholic friar of Belgian birth, who had earlier brought the Niagara Falls to the world's attention via a publication. Hennepin named them the Chutes de Saint-Antoine or the Falls of Saint Anthony after his patron saint, Anthony of Padua. Later explorers to document the falls include Zebulon Montgomery Pike and Jonathan Carver, the first Englishman to undertake an exploration of the west. His journey began in 1766 and, in some ways, was the precursor of the Lewis and Clark expedition; his book was the first popular American travel book." Carver created this early image, an engraving of the falls, in 1778.

Following the establishment of Fort Snelling in 1820, the falls became an attraction for tourists, writers, and artists who sought inspiration, even if Hennepin's descriptions were not as majestic as hoped for. By the 1850s a romantic "Indian legend" had become associated with the falls, describing a wife whose husband had taken a second bride. The offended first wife placed her child (or children) in a canoe and paddled toward the falls, plunging herself and her offspring to certain death as the husband looked on helplessly.

By the 1860s, industrial waste had filled the area and marred the falls' majesty. Further competition over the power of the falls on both banks of the river led to the Eastman tunnel disaster in 1869 which could have destroyed the falls. The disaster was fixed with a dike under the falls.

Industry

The first private land claim at the falls was made by Franklin Steele in 1838 — though he did not obtain financing for development until 1847, in the form of $12,000 for a nine-tenths stake in the property. On May 18, 1848, President James K. Polk approved the claims made in St. Anthony, and Steele was able to build his dam on the east side of the river above the Falls, blocking the east channel.

Steele dispatched logging crews to the Crow Wing River in December 1847 to supply pine for the sawmill, and by September 1, 1848, sawing commenced using two up-down saws. He was able to sell the lumber readily, supplying construction projects in the booming town. The new community at the Falls attracted entrepreneurs from New England, many of whom had experience in lumber and milling. He had hired Ard Godfrey to help build and run the first commercial sawmill at the Falls. Godfrey knew the most efficient ways to use natural resources, like the falls, and the great pine forests, to make lumber products. Godfrey built the first home in St. Anthony, Steele had the town platted in 1849, and it incorporated in 1855.

By 1854, 300 squatters occupied the west bank of the river, and in 1855, Congress recognized the squatters' right to purchase the land they had claimed. The west side quickly developed scores of new mills and consortia. They built a dam diagonally into the river to the north, which, along with Steele's dam created the inverted V-shape, still apparent today. Steele created the St. Anthony Falls Water Power Company in 1856 with three New York financiers, Davis, Gebhard, and Sanford. The company struggled for several years, due to poor relations with the financiers, a depression, and the Civil War. In 1868, the firm reorganized with new officers including John Pillsbury, Richard and Samuel Chute, Sumner Farnham, and Frederick Butterfield.

As Minneapolis (and its former neighbor across the river, St. Anthony) developed, the water power at the falls became a source of power for several industries including textile mills, wool, machinery, paper, and wood products, of which the North Star Woolen Mill was successful. Sawmills made the falls a major lumber producing area, with the mills largely built on platforms above the limestone cap forming the falls. But the dominant industry became flour milling. 

The falls industrialization was also a problem. Logs, sometimes a hundred at a time, escaped from log booms and hammered the falls. Diversion of water left parts of the limestone cap dry, increasing weathering effects. The falls quickly approached the edge of the limestone cap; once the limestone had completely eroded away, the falls would degenerate into sandstone rapids unsuitable for waterpower. To protect the falls and stop upstream progression a protective wood timber apron was built from the edge of the falls sloping downstream. The apron dissipated the energy of the falling water and moved it away from the base of the falls. It also protected from errant logs. An apron built in 1866 lasted until 1867. The Corps of Engineers completed one in 1880 that lasted until destroyed in 1952. It was replaced with a concrete apron.

The usual flour milling techniques did not work well for "spring wheat", which is the only kind that could be dependably grown on the rapidly expanding wheat farms in Minnesota and the Dakotas. In the late 1860s, major milling innovations at the falls were a "middlings purifier" and "gradual-reduction" grinding, both borrowed from Europe. Metal rollers replaced grindstones. The changes not only solved the spring wheat problem but produced high quality flour in a milling process that was highly profitable. As the result of the new technology, flour mills began to dominate the falls after 1870.

Millers on the Minneapolis side formed a consortium to extract power with the "Lowell model" in which water was supplied in a large headrace "power canal" connecting to the millpond above the falls and extending  parallel to the river below the falls. Mills built on both sides of the power canal diverted upper-level water into waterwheel-equipped vertical shafts (driven through the limestone bedrock into the soft, underlying sandstone) and then through horizontal tailrace tunnels to the falls' lower level. This system was very effective and mills lined the canal. "turning the west side of the river into the country's most densely industrialized, direct-drive waterpower district." The mills on the St. Anthony (east) side of the river were less-well organized for harnessing the power, and therefore industry developed at a slower pace on that side. But the Pillsbury A-Mill, built on the east bank and completed in 1881, was the world's largest flour mill for 18 years. It produced about 1/3 as much flour as the entire west side. The mills at the falls were very large and substantially automated. "By the end of the century, they had created the country's greatest waterpower industrial district, which was also the country's leading flour milling center from 1880 to 1930."

By the early 1900s, three companies controlled 97% of the falls flour production. They were the Pillsbury-Washburn Flour Mills Company (later Pillsbury Flour Mills Company and now General Mills), the Washburn-Crosby Company (later General Mills), and Northwestern Consolidated Milling Company (later Standard Milling Company)." The Pillsbury and Washburn-Crosby companies were started at the falls.

1869 collapse of the Eastman tunnel

The early dams built to harness the waterpower exposed the limestone to freezing and thawing forces, narrowed the channel, and increased damage from floods. A report in 1868 found that only  of the limestone remained upstream, and if it were eroded away, the falls would turn into a rapids that would no longer be useful for waterpower. Meanwhile, as the result of a lawsuit, the St. Anthony Falls Water Power Company approved a plan for the firm of William W. Eastman and John L. Merriam to build a tailrace tunnel from below the falls, under Hennepin Island, under the riverbed to Nicollet Island. The tailrace tunnel would allow waterpower development at the Island. This plan met with disaster on October 5, 1869, when the limestone cap was breached.

The leak turned into a torrent of water coming out the tunnel. The water blasted Hennepin Island, causing a  section to collapse into the tunnel. Believing that the mills and all the other industries around the falls would be ruined, hundreds of people rushed to view the impending disaster. Groups of volunteers started shoring up the gap by throwing trees and timber into the river, but that was ineffective. They then built a huge raft of timbers from the milling operations on Nicollet Island. This worked briefly, but also proved ineffective. A number of workers worked for months to build a dam that would funnel water away from the tunnel. The next year, an engineer from Lowell, Massachusetts, recommended completing a wooden apron, sealing the tunnel, and building low dams above the falls to avoid exposing the limestone to the weather.

The fix for the tunnel disaster was a concrete dike constructed by the United States Army Corps of Engineers. The dike, completed 1876, cut off the tunnel and any possible future bypass channels. A separate problem was damage to the falls and its upstream progression. To stop the damage the Corps built a protective wood timber apron completed 1880. The Corps also built two low dams, completed by 1880, on top of the limestone cap to keep the cap wet. The federal government spent $615,000 on this effort, while the two cities spent $334,500.

Hydroelectric power production

Hydroelectric power production also developed early at the falls. In 1881, the Pillsbury "A" Mill added a Brush Electric arc light plant powered from their turbines; some other mills did so also. In 1882, a Brush hydroelectric central station plant was in use, the third central station in the country. (Edison's Pearl Street Station also started producing electric power in 1882 - using steam.) The waterpower companies encouraged or developed hydroelectric plants. Major plants were completed in 1894. 1895, and 1908. (The first large scale production of electricity in the world was at the Adams (Tesla) plant at Niagara Falls starting 1895). As waterpower became available it was used to generate electricity. After the third plant was in operation in 1908, 45% of the waterpower being used was for hydroelectric. One of the historic St. Anthony Falls plants is still operating.

River flow is variable and flour production may have to be decreased with low flow rates. In the winter, mills may shut down because there is not enough water flow. So many mills supplemented water power with steam, starting with a 1,400 HP steam engine at the Pillsbury A mill in 1884. By 1892 ten of the fifteen mills had supplementary steam power. As electricity developed as a power source, some electricity was generated from steam to run equipment. Using electricity from the St. Anthony Falls hydroelectric plants was not very practical because those plants competed for the same water flow. But about 1910 electric power was available from St. Croix Falls and it was used in combination with waterpower and steam, and electricity eventually took over.

The Mississippi river flow rate changes based on how much rain there is its watershed. Starting 1880, dams were created on the Mississippi further north to create reservoirs - water could be released to increase flow at times when it would be low. This helped both waterpower industries and river navigation. The dams were at Lake Winnibigoshish, Leech Lake, Pokegama Falls, Pine River, Sandy Lake, and Gull Lake.

Locks and dams

St. Paul was effectively the upper limit of commercial navigation on the Mississippi. High bluffs on both sides of the river from the River Waren falls and the falls progressing up the Mississippi, made access difficult. In addition the rapid descent of the river from the falls to below what is now the Ford Dam (lock and dam #1) made the river shallow and fast running. The Ford dam, completed 1917, extended navigation to a little above the Washington Ave. bridge, with a shipping terminal on the west bank. Locks completed in 1956 at the lower dam and around the falls in 1963 extended navigation out of the river gorge to north Minneapolis. Since those two locks are smaller than most of the locks on the rest of the river, the practical limit for many commercial tows was still further downriver. In 2015, the Upper St. Anthony Falls lock was permanently closed to stop the spread of invasive species, namely Asian carp.

The St. Anthony Falls and the Upper Dam. The upper dam ("horseshoe dam"), built on top of the limestone cap forming the falls, is successor to dams built in the 1850s. The dam increases the head for two hydroelectric plants and increases the water level above the falls. The lift at this lock, is the highest of any lock on the Mississippi. The navigation channel required alteration of the historic Stone Arch Bridge, which now has a metal truss section to allow ships to pass below.

The dam was built for hydroelectric production, and included a power plant. There never was a falls at this location. The dam was rebuilt and locks added in 1956.

The current around the spillway/falls is often swift and dangerous. In 1991, a small boat drifted too close and fell over one part of the dam. One person on board was killed, and one had to be rescued by helicopter. Rescues at the site are usually much less dramatic, but continue to happen occasionally.

Geology

Over the succeeding 10,000 years, the falls moved upstream to its present location. The water churning at the bottom of the falls ate away at the soft sandstone, eventually breaking off the hard limestone cap in chunks as the falls receded. In the 6 miles (9.7 km) from the top of the falls (not including the horseshoe dam) to below the Ford dam the river drops 97 feet (30 m), all of it the remnant of the original 180 feet (55 m) falls. In a short time, geologically speaking, the falls will reach the end of the cap and become a rapids.
 Tributaries such as Minnehaha Creek begot their own waterfalls as the Mississippi River valley was cut into the landscape.

When Father Louis Hennepin documented the falls he estimated the falls' height to be . The height of the falls, not including the upper dam, is now . The river descends downstream from the falls, which might add another  to the falls where they were when Hennepin saw them.

The geological formation of the area consisted of a hard thin layer of Platteville Formation, a limestone, overlaying the soft St. Peter Sandstone subsurface. These layers were the result of an Ordovician Period sea which covered east-central Minnesota 500 million years ago.

Historic and commemorative markers

The area around the river was added to the National Register of Historic Places as the St. Anthony Falls Historic District in 1971. It includes 8th Avenue Northeast extending downstream to 6th Avenue Southeast and approximately two city blocks on both shoreline.

 The falls are a contributing resource to the Historic District. The district's archaeological record is one of the most-endangered historic sites in Minnesota. The National Register of Historic Places is facilitated by the National Park Service. The national significance of the Saint Anthony Falls Historic District is a major reason why the National Park Service's Mississippi National River and Recreation Area was established along the Mississippi River in the Minneapolis – Saint Paul metropolitan area.

A Heritage Trail plaque nearby says,

For untold generations of Indian people the Mississippi River was an important canoe route. To pass around the falls, the Dakota (Sioux) and Ojibway (Chippewa) used a well-established portage trail. Starting at a landing below the site now occupied by the steam plant, the trail climbed the bluff to this spot. From here it followed the east bank along what is now Main Street to a point well above the falls.

Water Works park overlooking the falls opened in 2021.

In popular culture

See also

 I-35W Mississippi River bridge, which collapsed in 2007
 List of contributing properties in the St. Anthony Falls Historic District
 Mississippi National River and Recreation Area
 Saint Anthony Main shopping area
 St. Anthony Falls Hydroelectric Development

References

References cited
 
The application from the City of Minneapolis to the National Park Service to place the St. Anthony Falls Historic District on the National Register of Historic Places (it was placed there). Consists of the original 1971 section and a much longer 1991 addition.  Has extensive information on the significance of the district and descriptions of "contributing resources". 
 
A heavily footnoted standard history of the development at the Falls.
  
 
 *

External links
Wheat Farms, Flour Mills, and Railroads: A Web of Interdependence, a National Park Service Teaching with Historic Places (TwHP) lesson plan
 St. Anthony Falls page within the NPS Mississippi National River and Recreation Area website
 St. Anthony Falls Heritage Board, outlining Heritage Trail and walking tours
 
 U.S. Army Corps of Engineers, St. Paul District: Upper St. Anthony Falls Lock and Dam
 U.S. Army Corps of Engineers, St. Paul District: Lower St. Anthony Falls Lock and Dam

Dams in Minnesota
Locks on the National Register of Historic Places in Minnesota
Geography of Minneapolis
Historic districts on the National Register of Historic Places in Minnesota
Minnesota state historic sites
Mississippi Gorge
National Register of Historic Places in Mississippi National River and Recreation Area
Mississippi River locks
National Register of Historic Places in Minneapolis
Waterfalls of Minnesota
United States Army Corps of Engineers dams
Tourist attractions in Minneapolis
Dams on the National Register of Historic Places in Minnesota
Landforms of Hennepin County, Minnesota
Submerged waterfalls